Morgan Andrew Allen (born 12 March 1990, Newport) is a professional rugby union and rugby league player for Cardiff RFC & West Wales Raiders in the Welsh Premier Division & RFL League 1. He has represented Wales at Under 18 and Under 20 level.

Personal
His father, Andy Allen, represented Wales on three occasions in 1990.

He attended Croesyceiliog Comprehensive School in Cwmbran, South Wales.

Rugby Union
In December 2009 Allen was selected in the Wales Under 20 squad for the U-20 Six Nations in February–March 2010 starting every game. In May 2010 he was included in the Wales Under-20 squad once more, this time for the Junior World Championship in Argentina in June 2010, scoring 3 tries in two games against Fiji.

In May 2015, Allen signed for the Scarlets for the 2015–16 season.

After being released from the Scarlets at the end of the 2016–17 season, Allen signed for Ealing Trailfinders in October 2017 for the remainder of the season. He subsequently joined Cardiff RFC.

In September 2019, Allen was named captain of Cardiff RFC

Rugby League

West Wales Raiders
On 28 Feb 2021 it was reported that he had signed for West Wales Raiders in the RFL League 1

References

External links
 Profile at scarlets.co.uk

1990 births
Living people
Aberavon RFC players
Bedwas RFC players
Cardiff RFC players
Carmarthen Quins RFC players
Ealing Trailfinders Rugby Club players
Llanelli RFC players
Ospreys (rugby union) players
Pontypool RFC players
Rugby league players from Newport, Wales
Rugby union flankers
Rugby union number eights
Rugby union players from Newport, Wales
Scarlets players
South Wales Scorpions players
Swansea RFC players
Welsh rugby league players
Welsh rugby union players